Buffelsbaai (also Buffels Bay and Buffalo Bay) is a small seaside village 20 kilometres  from Knysna in the Garden Route District Municipality in the Western Cape province of South Africa. The village is named after Buffelsbaai which stretches east of the village. It is a popular vacation destination with a small waterfront with stores. 

The cargo ship Kiani Satu, travelling from Hong Kong to Ghana with a shipment of rice, ran aground and sank off the coast of the town in August 2013. Leaked oil from the vessel threatened the nearby Goukamma Nature Reserve; 217 birds were cleaned by SANCCOB after the spill.

References

Populated places in the Knysna Local Municipality